Acidoxantha is a genus of tephritid  or fruit flies in the family Tephritidae.

Acidoxantha species

 Acidoxantha assita (Hardy, 1973)

 Acidoxantha balabacensis (Hardy, 1970)

 Acidoxantha bifasciata (Hardy, 1987)

 Acidoxantha bisinuata (Hancock, 1985)

 Acidoxantha bombacis (de Meijere, 1938)

 Acidoxantha galibeedu (David & Ramadi, 2014)

 Acidoxantha hibisci (Hardy, 1974)

 Acidoxantha minor (Hardy, 1974)

 Acidoxantha nana (Hering, 1940)

 Acidoxantha punctiventris (Hendel, 1914)

 Acidoxantha quadrivittata (Hardy, 1974)

 Acidoxantha quinaria (Permkam & Hancock, 1995)

 Acidoxantha totoflava (Hardy, 1973)

References

Trypetinae
Tephritidae genera